Órlaithí Flynn (born 13 May 1988) is an Irish politician and MLA who represents Belfast West in the Northern Ireland Assembly.

The daughter of Patrick Flynn, an Irish republican in West Belfast, Flynn was educated at St Dominic's Grammar School for Girls before studying politics at the University of Ulster. She then completed a master's degree in Irish politics at Queen's University Belfast.

Flynn joined Sinn Féin as a teenager.  She worked as an adviser to a succession of politicians: Rosie McCorley, Sue Ramsey and, finally, Alex Maskey.  In 2016, she was selected by the party to become a Member of the Legislative Assembly for Belfast West, replacing Jennifer McCann. Flynn was re-elected in the assembly elections of March 2017.

References

External links
 

1988 births
Living people
Alumni of Queen's University Belfast
Alumni of Ulster University
Politicians from Belfast
Sinn Féin MLAs
Northern Ireland MLAs 2016–2017
Northern Ireland MLAs 2017–2022
Female members of the Northern Ireland Assembly
People educated at St Dominic's Grammar School for Girls
Northern Ireland MLAs 2022–2027